Molde FK 2, commonly known as just Molde 2, is the reserve team of Molde FK. They currently play in 3. divisjon, the fourth tier of Norwegian league football. Reserve teams have been allowed to play in the Norwegian league system since 1990, and Molde 2 have competed every year.

As a reserve team, the highest league Molde 2 can currently enter is the 2. divisjon, the third tier of the league system. The team played in 2. divisjon in 1991, between 1996 and 2006 and from 2009 to 2016, when it was relegated to 3. divisjon.

Current squad

Out on loan

Staff

Coaching staff

Medical and sport science staff

Recent history
 

Source: NIFS.no

Notes

History of league positions 
Reserve teams have been eligible to play in the Norwegian league system since 1990.

See also
Reserve teams in Norwegian football

References

External links
 Official website

 
Norwegian reserve football teams
Sport in Molde